The Old Masonic Hall in Booneville, Mississippi, is a historic building that was designated a Mississippi Landmark in 1999. There is also a Old Masonic Hall in Louisville, Mississippi, also known as Community House, and as Chamber of Commerce, is a historic building built in 1851.

References

Former Masonic buildings in Mississippi
Buildings and structures in Prentiss County, Mississippi
Mississippi Landmarks